Conrad Habicht  (December 28, 1876 in Schaffhausen – October 23, 1958 in Schaffhausen) was a Swiss mathematician and close personal friend of Albert Einstein.

Association With Einstein
Together with Maurice Solovine, the three founded the Olympia Academy, an informal circle of friends who met together in Bern from 1902 to 1904 to discuss physics and philosophy.

Habicht and Solovine were the only two witnesses to Einstein's 1903 wedding to Mileva Marić.

Habicht was the recipient of Einstein's 1905 letter in which Einstein described his Annus Mirabilis papers. Habich also received Einstein's letter about quanta.

Einstein and Solovine lost contact with Habicht but regained contact in 1947.

A book of letters between Einstein and Habicht in German Language was published in 2000.

Early Life
Habicht came from a middle class family in Schaffhausen and grew up there with four brothers and sisters. Son of Johann Conrad Habicht, merchant, and Susanna Elisabetha Oechslin, from Schaffhausen. In 1913 he married Anna Margarethe Kehlstadt, teacher, from Basel. He studied mathematics and physics in Zurich, Munich and Berlin, earning a doctors degree in 1903 at Bern, writing a dissertation on series of circles by Steiner. He studied violin.

Conrad's brother Paul was active in early development of automobile engines and had many Swiss patents.

University And School Teacher
Habicht taught university master's level mathematics and physics 11 years at Schiers in the Canton of the Graubünden where he also played violin. Then he taught mathematics and physics 33 years at  Schaffhausen Canton high school, retiring in 1948.

Habicht and Einstein invented a meter for measuring very small electric potentials in millivolts with Conrad's brother Paul.

Einstein wrote to Habicht about his first attempt to explain the perihelion advance of Mercury.

Habicht wrote and published a book in Swiss German, biography of Gustav Kugler 1874-1939 a Rector of the Schaffhausen Canton school. He also published 5 editions of his mathematics in addition to his dissertation. Between 1943 and 1947 Habicht published another 6 books in 10 editions about the Swiss view of the world around them. He also published an education article about technical supervision of students. Habicht only published in Swiss German language.

Later Life
Habicht was in retirement from teaching ten years, continuing to direct a local music academy until 1958. He died four years after injury in an accident, survived by his wife, four children and ten grand children.

Literature 
  Autor: Thomas Franz Schneider 
 Jürgen Neffe: Einstein. Eine Biografie. Rowohlt, Reinbek bei Hamburg 2006.
 Maurice Solovine: Freundschaft mit Albert Einstein. In: Physikalische Blätter 15 (1959), 3, S. 97–103.
 Albert Einstein: Eine neue elektrostatische Methode zur Messung kleinster Elektrizitätsmengen. In: Physikalische Zeitschrift 7 (1908), S. 216–217.

Web Links 
 Hans-Josef Küpper: Akademie Olympia, bei Einstein.de
 
 German Language Page: 
 French Language Page:

References

1876 births
1958 deaths
20th-century Swiss mathematicians
People from Schaffhausen